"Let Me!" is a song written by Mark Lindsay and performed by Paul Revere & the Raiders.  
The song was arranged and produced by Mark Lindsay. It was featured on their 1969 album Alias Pink Puzz.

It reached #20 on the U.S. pop chart in 1969.  
The song ranked #100 on Billboard magazine's Top 100 singles of 1969.

References

1969 songs
1969 singles
Paul Revere & the Raiders songs
Columbia Records singles
Songs written by Mark Lindsay